The 2018 Kagame Interclub Cup is the 41st edition of the Kagame Interclub Cup, a football competition for clubs in East and Central Africa, which is organised by CECAFA. It took place in Tanzania from 29 June to 13 July 2018.

All times shown are in East Africa Time (UTC+3).

Participants
The following 12 clubs took part in the competition:

Group A
 Azam
 Vipers
 JKU
 Kator

Group B
 Rayon Sports
 Gor Mahia
 AS Port
 LLB Académic

Group C
 Simba
 A.P.R.
 Dekedaha
 Singida United

Officials

Referees
 Omar Abdulkadir Artan (Somalia)
 Louis Hakizimana (Rwanda)
 Peter Waweru (Kenya)
 Ssali Mashood  (Uganda)
 Emmanuel Mwandembwa (Tanzania)
 Saddam Houssein Mansour (Djibouti)
 Thierry Nkurunziza (Burundi)
 Ring Nyier Akech Malong (South Sudan)
 Ali Mfaume Nassoro (Zanzibar)

Assistant Referees

 Hamza Haji Abdi  (Somalia)
 Theogene Ndagijimana (Rwanda)
 Gilbert Cheruiyot (Kenya)
 Tony Kidiya (Kenya)
 Dick Okello (Uganda)
 Salah  Abdi Mohamed (Djibouti)
 Willy Habimana (Burundi)
 Gasim Madir Dehiya (South Sudan)
 Mohamed Mkono (Tanzania)

Group stage
 
The group stage featured twelve teams, with 4 teams in Group A, Group B and C. Two teams from Group A and B and Group C advanced to the knockout stage.

Group A

Group B

Group C

Knockout stage

Quarter-finals

Semi-finals

Third place play-off

Final

Top scorers

References

Kagame Interclub Cup
Kagame Interclub Cup
2018 in Tanzanian sport
International association football competitions hosted by Tanzania